Paul Whittaker may refer to:

Paul Whittaker (cricketer) (born 1965), English cricketer.
Paul Whittaker (newspaper editor), Australian newspaper journalist and editor
Paul Whittaker, Australian naval officer serving as Warrant Officer of the Navy from 1993 to 1997

See also
Paul Whitaker (born 1973), English cricketer